Personne d'autre is the 28th and final studio album by French singer Françoise Hardy. It was released in April 2018 under Parlophone/Warner Music.

Personne d’autre features 10 original songs, including one sung in English, "You’re My Home" penned by Yael Naim, a cover of Michel Berger’s "Seras-tu là", and an adaption of Finnish band Poets Of The Fall’s ‘Sleep’, titled as "Dors mon ange"

Background
According to Hardy, she hadn't planned to release an album, but after she heard "Sleep" by Finnish band Poets of the Fall, she showed it to her friend Erick Benzi, who had similar melodies at that time, and it inspired her to write some lyrics.
Meanwhile, La Grande Sophie, who knew that she started writing again, sent her the song "Le Large" (Sailing Away) out of the blue, and she got another haunting melody from Pascale Daniel, then a song by Yael Naim brought some tears to her eyes.

Track listing

Certifications

References

Françoise Hardy albums
2018 albums
French-language albums